The women's long jump at the 2011 IPC Athletics World Championships was held at the QEII Stadium from 23–27 January 2011.

Medalists

References
Complete Results Book from the 2011 IPC Athletics World Championships
Official site of the 2011 IPC Athletics World Championships

long jump
2011 in women's athletics
Long jump at the World Para Athletics Championships